Leona Roberts (born Leona Celinda Doty; July 26, 1879 – January 29, 1954) was an American stage and film actress.

Life and career
Roberts was born in a small village in Illinois. According to Find A Grave she was born in Monroe Twp, Ashtabula County, Ohio. She made her debut on Broadway in 1926 and appeared there in about 40 productions between 1926 and 1945, mostly in supporting roles.

Roberts started her film career in 1926 as the lead in Poor Mrs. Jones, produced by the United States Department of Agriculture. She went to Hollywood in 1937 and played in over 40 films, mostly in motherly supporting roles. She portrayed "society gossip" Mrs. Meade in Gone with the Wind (1939).

Roberts also appeared with Cary Grant and Katharine Hepburn in the screwball comedy Bringing Up Baby (1938) as the house servant Mrs. Gogarty, as well in Of Human Hearts (1938) with James Stewart and The Blue Bird (1940) with Shirley Temple.

In 1941, she returned to Broadway, where she worked until the mid-1940s. Subsequently, Roberts worked again in Hollywood and made a few last films there, including a small part in The Loves of Carmen (1948). She made her last film in 1949.

Personal life/death
Roberts died in 1954, age 74. She was the mother of actress Josephine Hutchinson.

Filmography

 Poor Mrs. Jones! (1926) – Lane Jones
 Border Cafe (1937) – Mrs. Emily Whitney
 Super-Sleuth (1937) – Mrs. Effington (uncredited)
 There Goes the Groom (1937) – Martha
 Fight for Your Lady (1937) – Cleaning Woman
 Quick Money (1937) – Gossiping Woman (uncredited)
 Crashing Hollywood (1938) – Extra Assigned to Stage 6 (uncredited)
 Everybody's Doing It (1938) – Woman at Bar (uncredited)
 Of Human Hearts (1938) – Sister Clarke
 Bringing Up Baby (1938) – Mrs. Gogarty
 Condemned Women (1938) – Kate Holt
 This Marriage Business (1938) – Mrs. Platt
 Having Wonderful Time (1938) – Mrs. Shaw
 Crime Ring (1938) – Mrs. Wharton
 The Affairs of Annabel (1938) – Mrs. Hurley
 I Stand Accused (1938) – Mrs. Davis
 Kentucky (1938) – Grace Goodwin
 Boy Slaves (1939) – Farm Woman (uncredited)
 Persons in Hiding (1939) – Ma Bronson
 They Made Her a Spy (1939) – Ella
 Bachelor Mother (1939) – Old Lady Outside Orphanage (uncredited)
 The Spellbinder (1939) – Mrs. Jenkins (uncredited)
 The Escape (1939) – Aunt Mamie Qualen
 Three Sons (1939) – Woman in Store (uncredited)
 Sued for Libel (1939) – Mrs. Trent
 Gone with the Wind (1939) – Mrs. Meade
 Swanee River (1939) – Mrs. Foster
 Thou Shalt Not Kill (1939) – Mrs. Stevens
 The Man Who Wouldn't Talk (1940) – (uncredited)
 The Blue Bird (1940) – Mrs. Berlingot
 Abe Lincoln in Illinois (1940) – Mrs. Rutledge
 Ski Patrol (1940) – Mother Ryder
 Flight Angels (1940) – Mrs. Hutchinson
 Gangs of Chicago (1940) – Mrs. Whitaker
 Anne of Windy Poplars (1940) – (uncredited)
 Queen of the Mob (1940) – Mrs. Greenough
 Golden Gloves (1940) – Mrs. Parker (uncredited)
 Comin' Round the Mountain (1940) – Aunt Polly Watters
 Wildcat Bus (1940) – Emma 'Ma' Talbot
 Blondie Plays Cupid (1940) – Aunt Hannah
 Week-End in Havana (1941) – Passenger
 Dixie (1943) – Woman in Restaurant (uncredited)
 The Madonna's Secret (1946) – Mrs. Corbin
 Boomerang! (1947) – Mrs. Crossman (uncredited)
 The Loves of Carmen (1948) – Ancient Old Gypsy (uncredited)
 Chicago Deadline (1949) – Maggie (uncredited) (final film role)

References

External links
 
 
 
 

1879 births
1954 deaths
20th-century American actresses
Actresses from Illinois
American stage actresses
American film actresses
People from Bond County, Illinois